YSC may refer to:

Acronyms and initialisms
 Yerevan Komitas State Conservatory a conservatory located in Yerevan, Armenia
 Young Survival Coalition an international group for women under 40 who have been diagnosed with breast cancer
 Youth detention center#Youth Services Center the District of Columbia's secure juvenile detention center

Codes
 Sherbrooke Airport has IATA code YSC
 Jassic dialect has ISO 639-3 code ysc